The Metro Line is a light rail transit line on the Edmonton LRT system. The line operates from northwest Edmonton to south Edmonton, and was scheduled to have begun operation by spring 2014 but instead opened on September 6, 2015, at a reduced speed and frequency. The line uses  of new track, three new stations, and seven stations on the existing Capital Line. In August 2021, service on the Metro Line was modified to end at Health Sciences/Jubilee station, as was originally planned but delayed due to signalling issues which caused trains to run a reduced frequency to the interim terminus at Century Park station to ensure the Capital Line could run at full frequency. The cost of the project was $665 million, jointly funded by the City of Edmonton, Province of Alberta, and the Government of Canada. It is the first new line that is not an extension of the existing line. The line was expected to add 13,200 riders per weekday. A number of roadworks are under construction or completed to revitalize the surrounding community. An extension to the northwest city limits has completed conceptual design, and a further extension is proposed through the city of St. Albert on Highway 2/St. Albert Trail.

History
In spring 2007, the funding for a concept plan and preliminary engineering was commissioned, and the City approved the plan the next year. In 2008, during construction of the Epcor Tower, the City ordered that the tunnel section below the tower be dug before the tower was completed, this saved $140 million from digging after the tower was built. The remainder of the tunnel, under Downtown Edmonton, was constructed using the sequential excavation method, and completed in November 2012. In 2009 the City approved the relocation of funds from the Gorman extension to the Metro Line, as the City felt northwest was a higher priority. In 2010, the city began preparation work, including utility relocations, building removals, roadwork, Kingsway road reconstruction and track slab construction. The permanent closure of 105 Avenue between 102 Street and 105 Street was performed so MacEwan Station could be built. 105 Street was permanently closed to vehicular traffic between 107 Avenue and 108 Avenue to allow the line to continue along the existing road corridor, which alleviated the need to widen the corridor and remove some existing trees. 104 Street was closed between 108 Avenue and Kingsway in a similar fashion. Construction was completed in 2014 in time to accommodate a spring 2014 opening. Bus service began for the first Metro Line facility, the Kingsway/Royal Alex Transit Centre, on June 29, 2014. The public plaza surrounding MacEwan Station, except for the area required to build Rogers Place, opened for use by people other than the construction crew in December 2014.

Signalling issues
Testing began in July 2013, and the line began operation in September 2015 with restrictions. There were three delays in beginning operations on the line: one from April to June 2014, one from June to December 2014, and another from December 2014 to February 2015. The delays were caused by issues with the signalling system built by Thales. Thales gave control of the system to the City of Edmonton in March 2015, but failed to provide adequate documentation to place the line into service. In February 2017, trains were cleared to travel at 50 km/h. The Thales signalling system used communications-based train control (CBTC) where trains occupy a "footprint", measure, and adjust their operation relative to the next train in front of them, hence the term "moving block" (as opposed to a traditional fixed block signal where each block is occupied by a train).

In September 2018, the Toronto Star reported that Edmonton had given Thales until April 30, 2017, to bring the system to full functionality.  Edmonton had withheld $22 million from Thales, until the system was fully functional.  When Thales did not meet this deadline Edmonton gave Thales a "notice of default".  On September 13, 2018, Edmonton announced Thales had promised the signalling system would be fully functional by December 2018.  Edmonton also announced there was a backup plan, to keep the route functioning, if Thales failed to deliver.

In April 2019, the City of Edmonton terminated its contract with Thales, and sought other options to complete the line and bring it up to full service. According to testing completed in December 2018, the Thales signalling system could not keep trains on schedule, and caused trains to stop unexpectedly. Alstom was selected to replace the Thales system.

In March 2021 the Alstom signalling system came online, fully replacing the Thales system. This allows the line to operate at full speed every 5 minutes when demand calls for it. Alstom's system is a fixed-block system similar to the existing Capital Line, which will allow inter-operation between the shared track from Century Park to Churchill without compatibility issues arising.

Future

Edmonton extension
An extension from the permanent NAIT station is in the planning phases by the City of Edmonton. The recommendation, released in May 2010, extends the Metro Line through Blatchford (the sustainable community being developed on the grounds of the former City Centre Airport) over Yellowhead Trail and the CN Railway yard, along 113A Street and 153 Avenue to the City of St. Albert limits. The extension would have eight stations, including stops in Blatchford, Rosslyn, Griesbach, Castle Downs, The Palisades, and at Campbell Road. As part of this extension, a park and ride is proposed at Campbell Rd and 153 Ave. This type of line is planned to run with less separation from other traffic, mostly with lower track speeds, no higher than general purpose traffic, still with traffic signal priority and dedicated lanes. This extension is 11 km long, and will have 8 new stations and a rebuilt NAIT station slightly to the west of its current location. This section of the line is not planned to use gate arms, bells and flashing lights as has been done with the Metro Line from NAIT to Churchill.

Expansion of the Metro Line will occur in three phases. In June 2020, construction began on phase one: The extension of the Metro Line to Blatchford. This extension consists of two stops: NAIT/Blatchford Market, which will replace the temporary NAIT station currently in use, and Blatchford Gate. According to the city of Edmonton, the second phase will move forward when funding becomes available.

St. Albert extension
The City of St. Albert began studying extending Edmonton's LRT in early 2013, identifying four possible locations for stations. On November 12, 2013, St. Albert council decided to continue studying LRT alignment options, but not to put any money into purchasing land or rail cars. The selected corridor was approved by St. Albert city council on December 2, 2014, which will run on St. Albert Trail and proposed four possible station locations. The line is proposed to be primarily aligned to the east of St. Albert Trail, reducing it to four lanes north of Hebert Road. As well, there are three new bridges proposed along the St. Albert extension to span Anthony Henday Drive, Sir Winston Churchill Avenue, and the Sturgeon River.

Stations

Future stations
The City of Edmonton approved the concept plan for a northwest LRT line, and nine stations, on May 1, 2013.

Proposed stations
The City of St. Albert identified four possible locations for stations in early 2013. In October 2015, the preferred location and alignment of the St. Albert extension was published in the Phase 2 report for the extension. Transit stations are proposed for the Downtown St. Albert, and the North St. Albert stations while park and ride services are only proposed for North St. Albert station.

References

External links
ETS Metro Line web page – The City of Edmonton
Metro Line (NAIT to North City Limits) Project page - City of Edmonton
 published by the City of Edmonton. Animated tour of the Metro Line from Churchill Station to NAIT Station.

 
Rapid transit lines in Canada